Emin is Albanian, Bosnian and Turkish name, It is also a variant  of the Arabic masculine given name Amin (Arabic: أمين amiyn, amīn). Notable people with the name include:

 Ahmet Emin Yalman (1888–1972), Turkish journalist
 Emin Agaev (born 1973), Azerbaijani retired footballer
 Emin Agalarov (born 1979), Azerbaijani singer and songwriter, known as Emin
 Emin Ahmadov (born 1986), Azerbaijani wrestler
 Emin Aladağ (born 1983), Turkish footballer
 Emin Azizov (born 1984), Azerbaijani wrestler
 Emin Cihangir Akşit (born 1953), Turkish major general and NATO official
 Emin Çölaşan (born 1942), Turkish investigative journalist
 Emin Duraku (1918–1942), Albanian communist
 Emin Fuat Keyman (born 1958), Turkish political scientist
 Emin Garibov (born 1990), Russian artistic gymnast
 Emin Gök (born 1988), Turkish volleyball player
 Emin Guliyev (swimmer) (born 1975), Azerbaijani swimmer
 Emin Halid Onat (1908–1961), Turkish architect and former rector of Istanbul Technical University
 Emin Imamaliev (born 1980), Azerbaijani footballer
 Emin Ismajli (born 1982), Albanian footballer
 Emin Jafarguliyev (born 1990), Azerbaijani footballer
 Emin Kadi, American fashion photographer, journalist, art director, and magazine publisher
 Emin Makhmudov (born 1992), Azerbaijani-Russian footballer
 Emin Milli (born 1979), Azerbaijani writer and dissident
 Emin Nouri (born 1985), Swedish-Turkish footballer
 Emin Fahrettin Özdilek (1898–1989), Turkish military officer and politician
 Emin Pasha (1840–1892), Egyptian physician, naturalist and governor
 Emin Quliyev (born 1977), Azerbaijani footballer
 Emin Sabitoglu (1937–2000), Azerbaijani composer
 Emin Bülent Serdaroğlu (1886–1942), Turkish footballer
 Emin Sulimani (born 1986), Austrian footballer
 Mehmed Emin (disambiguation)
 Mehmed Emin Pasha (disambiguation)

See also 
 Emine
 Emin (surname)
 Emin (disambiguation)

Turkish masculine given names